Bård Langsåvold (born 31 January 1952) is a Norwegian politician for the Labour Party.

He served as a deputy representative to the Parliament of Norway from Nord-Trøndelag during the terms 2005–2009 and 2009–2013. He is also mayor of Meråker since 1995.

References

1952 births
Living people
People from Meråker
Deputy members of the Storting
Labour Party (Norway) politicians
Mayors of places in Nord-Trøndelag
Place of birth missing (living people)